The Viper is a public house at The Common, Mill Green, Essex, CM4 0PT.

It is on the Campaign for Real Ale's National Inventory of Historic Pub Interiors.

References

National Inventory Pubs
Pubs in Essex